Terry Ablade (born 12 October 2001) is a professional footballer who plays for Fulham as a striker. Born in Ghana, he has represented Finland at youth level.

Early life
Ablade was born in Accra, Ghana, to Ghanaian parents, and he moved to Finland when he was seven years old. His father is the former footballer Seth Ablade.

Club career
After playing in his native Finland with FC Jazz, he moved to English club Fulham in July 2018, before moving on loan to AFC Wimbledon in January 2022.

International career
Ablade is a Finnish youth international, representing them at under-17, under-19 and under-21 levels.

References

2001 births
Living people
Finnish footballers
FC Jazz players
Fulham F.C. players
AFC Wimbledon players
Kakkonen players
English Football League players
Association football forwards
Finland youth international footballers
Finland under-21 international footballers
Finnish expatriate footballers
Finnish expatriates in England
Expatriate footballers in England
Finnish people of Ghanaian descent
Ghanaian emigrants
Ghanaian emigrants to Finland
Naturalized citizens of Finland
Footballers from Accra